The federal electoral redistribution of 2012 was a redistribution of electoral districts ("ridings") in Canada following the results of the 2011 Canadian census. As a result of amendments to the Constitution Act, 1867, the number of seats in the House of Commons of Canada increased from 308 to 338. The previous electoral redistribution was in 2003.

Background and previous attempts at reform
Prior to 2012, the redistribution rules for increasing the number of seats in the House of Commons of Canada was governed by section 51 of the Constitution Act, 1867, as last amended in 1985. As early as 2007, attempts were made to reform the calculation of how that number was determined, as the 1985 formula did not fully take into account the rapid population growth being experienced in the provinces of Alberta, British Columbia and Ontario.

The revised formula, as originally presented, was estimated to have the following impact:

Three successive bills were presented by the Government of Canada before its final form was passed by the House of Commons and Senate in 2011.

Passage of the Fair Representation Act (2011)
The expansion of the House from 308 seats to 338 seats is pursuant to the Fair Representation Act, which came into force on December 16, 2011. In introducing the bill, the government's stated aims were:

allocating more seats to better reflect population grown in Ontario, British Columbia, and Alberta;
maintaining the number of seats for slower-growing provinces; and
maintaining the proportional representation of Quebec according to population.

The Act replaced s. 51(1) of the Constitution Act, 1867 with the following formula:

Divide the estimated population of a province by a determined electoral quotient (initially set at 111,166).
If the number of members determined is less than what a province had in 1985, increase its seat count to that number (the "grandfather clause").
If a province's population was overrepresented in the House of Commons at the completion of the last redistribution process, and would now be under-represented based on the calculations above, it will be given extra seats so that its share of House of Commons seats is proportional to its share of the population (the "representation rule").
Add one seat for each of the territories.

The 1985 minimum has two components:

No province can have fewer MPs than it has senators (the "senatorial clause").
Otherwise, the calculation determined in 1985 under the Constitution Act, 1985 (Representation) will govern the amount.

The addition of three seats in Quebec marked the first time since the adoption of the 1985 electoral redistribution formula that any province besides Ontario, Alberta and British Columbia gained new seats.

Process of redistribution
The allocation of seats to the provinces and territories was based on rules in the Constitution of Canada as well as population estimates made by Statistics Canada based on the 2006 census (in particular, the allocation is based on an estimate for the population as of July 1, 2011, "based on 2006 Census population counts adjusted for census net undercoverage and incompletely enumerated Indian reserves").

A final report was tabled October 2013, with the changes proclaimed to take effect as of the first dissolution of Parliament occurring after May 1, 2014. The names of some ridings were changed when the Riding Name Change Act, 2014 came into force on June 19, 2014.

In a report issued in 2014 Elections Canada noted: "While some administrative tasks remained to be done after that point, Elections Canada's role of supporting the federal electoral boundaries commissions, which had worked for up to 18 months in their respective provinces, was complete." The report concluded that "the process for the 2012 redistribution of federal electoral boundaries was a success."

Effect of 2013 Representation Orders

|-
! colspan="2" style="text-align:left;" | Party !! BC !! AB !! SK !! MB !!ON !! QC !! NB !! PE !! NS !! NL !! Territories!! Total
|-

| 28 ||33 ||11 ||11 ||83 ||5 ||8 ||1 ||4 ||2 ||2 ||188
|-

|11  ||1 || 2||3 ||24 ||61 ||1 || ||3 ||2 ||1 ||109
|-

| 2 || ||1 || ||14 ||8 ||1 ||3 ||4 ||3 || ||36
|-

|  || || || || ||4 || || || || || ||4
|-

| 1 || || || || || || || || || || ||1
|-
! colspan="2" style="text-align:left;" | Total
! style="text-align:right;" |42
! style="text-align:right;" |34
! style="text-align:right;" |14
! style="text-align:right;" |14
! style="text-align:right;" |121
! style="text-align:right;" |78
! style="text-align:right;" |10
! style="text-align:right;" |4
! style="text-align:right;" |11
! style="text-align:right;" |7
! style="text-align:right;" |3
! style="text-align:right;" |338
|}

Compared to the House of Commons seat allocation in effect for the 41st Canadian Parliament (which convened in 2011), the changes were as follows:

References

Further reading

External links
Official site of the 2012 Federal Electoral Districts Redistribution commissions

Electoral redistributions in Canada
2012 in Canadian politics